SS Daring was the name of several steamships, including:

, a Puget Sound steamboat
, a Liberian steamship

Ship names